Kunzea preissiana is a flowering plant in the myrtle family, Myrtaceae, and is endemic to the southwest of Western Australia. It is a shrub with hairy branches and leaves, pink to mauve flowers in groups on the ends of shoots, and twenty to thirty stamens about the same length as the petals. It is a widespread, often locally common species across its range.

Description
The flowers are arranged in groups of between about three and seven on the ends of shoots that continue to grow after flowering. There are hairy bracts and bracteoles at the base of the flowers, distinguishing this species from the similar K. affinis. Flowering mainly occurs in September and October and the fruit is a hairy, urn-shaped capsule with the sepals spreading at right angles.

This is a widespread kunze in the southwest and there is considerable variation in the species, especially in the hairs on the leaves and flower parts and some forms are very similar to K. acicularis.

Taxonomy and naming
Kunzea preissiana was first formally described by the botanist Johannes Conrad Schauer in 1844 in Johann Georg Christian Lehmann's book Plantae Preissianae.

Distribution and habitat
This kunzea grows in gravelly lateritic soil in kwongan and shrubland between Narrogin, Albany and to the east of Hopetoun in the Avon Wheatbelt, Esperance Plains, Jarrah Forest and Mallee biogeographic regions.

Conservation
Kunzea preissiana is classified as "not threatened" by the Western Australian Government Department of Parks and Wildlife.

References

preissiana
Endemic flora of Western Australia
Myrtales of Australia
Rosids of Western Australia
Plants described in 1844
Taxa named by Johannes Conrad Schauer